Morag Joss (born in 1955 in England) is a British writer. She became a writer in 1996 after an early career in arts and museum management.

Life and career
Joss was born in England in 1955 and from the age of four, grew up in Ayrshire, Scotland.

She is the author of eight novels, including the Sara Selkirk series, and Half Broken Things, which won the Crime Writers Association (CWA) Silver Dagger Award. She began writing in 1996 after a short story of hers was runner-up in a national competition sponsored by Good Housekeeping magazine. A visit to the Roman Baths with crime writer P.D. James germinated the plot of her first novel, Funeral Music (1998), the first in the Sara Selkirk series.  It was nominated for a Dilys Award for the year's best mystery published in the USA.

Her later novels have moved increasingly towards literary fiction.  In 2008 she was a Heinrich Böll writer in residence on Achill Island, County Mayo, Ireland.

Half Broken Things was adapted as a television film in 2007, starring Penelope Wilton.

In 2009 her sixth novel, The Night Following (2008) won a coveted Edgar Award nomination in the Best Novel category.

Bibliography

Sara Selkirk novels
 Funeral Music  (1998 - nominated for the Dilys Award)
 Fearful Symmetry (1999)
 Fruitful Bodies (2001)

Other novels
 Half-Broken Things (2003 - CWA Silver Dagger award winner)
 Puccini's Ghosts (2005)
 The Night Following (2008 - nominated for the Edgar Award in Best Novel category)
 Across the Bridge (2011) (U.S. title, Among the Missing)
 Our Picnics in the Sun (2013)
 Good to Go (announced as being written)

References

Scottish crime fiction writers
Living people
Scottish women novelists
Women mystery writers
20th-century Scottish novelists
Writers of Gothic fiction
20th-century British women writers
20th-century Scottish women
1955 births